The  is a Japanese railway line which connects Okayama Station in Okayama to Uno Station in Tamano, both in Okayama Prefecture. It is owned and run by the West Japan Railway Company (JR West). Part of the line, between Okayama Station and Chayamachi Station, is known as the Seto-Ōhashi Line.

Stations
L: Limited express Shiokaze, Nanpū, Sunrise Seto, and Uzushio
M: Rapid Marine Liner

All trains stop at stations marked "●" and pass stations marked "｜".  
Some trains stop at "▲", and a few trains stop at "△"
Goes another route at "=".

Rolling stock

History
The entire line opened on 12 June 1910, and until the opening of the Seto Ohashi Bridge in 1988, was the main railway connection to Shikoku (via the Takamatsu ferry). With the privatization of JNR on 1 April 1987, the line came under the control of JR West.

See also
 List of railway lines in Japan

References

1067 mm gauge railways in Japan
1910 establishments in Japan
Lines of West Japan Railway Company
Rail transport in Okayama Prefecture
Railway lines opened in 1910